The men's 400 metres sprint event at the 1932 Olympic Games took place on August 4 and August 5 at the Los Angeles Memorial Coliseum. Twenty-seven athletes from 15 nations competed. The 1930 Olympic Congress in Berlin had reduced the limit from 4 athletes per NOC to 3 athletes. The event was won by Bill Carr of the United States, that nation's second consecutive title and sixth overall in the event (all by different men). Ben Eastman's silver marked the first time countrymen had gone one-two in the event since the United States did it at the first three Olympics (1896, 1900, and 1904, including a podium sweep in 1904).

Background

This was the ninth appearance of the event, which is one of 12 athletics events to have been held at every Summer Olympics. The defending gold medalist, Ray Barbuti of the United States, did not return, but 1928 silver medalist Jimmy Ball of Canada and bronze medalist Joachim Büchner of Germany did. The United States had a strong team, led by Ben Eastman (who had just set the world record at 46.4 seconds) and Bill Carr (who had beaten Eastman at the U.S. Olympic trials and the IC4A championships).

New Zealand appeared in the event for the first time. The United States made its ninth appearance in the event, the only nation to compete in it at every Olympic Games to that point.

Competition format

The competition retained the basic four-round format from 1920. With fewer athletes than previous editions, the first round was reduced to 6 heats (vs. 15 in 1928). Each heat had between 4 and 6 athletes. The top three runners in each heat advanced to the quarterfinals. There were 3 quarterfinals of 6 runners each; the top four athletes in each quarterfinal heat advanced to the semifinals. The semifinals featured 2 heats of 6 runners each. The top two runners in each semifinal heat advanced, making a six-man final.

Records

These were the standing world and Olympic records (in seconds) prior to the 1924 Summer Olympics.

Bill Carr broke the Olympic record in the semifinals (with a 47.2 second mark) and the world record in the final (officially at 46.2 seconds, auto-timed at 46.28 seconds).

Schedule

Results

Heats

Six heats were held; the fastest three runners advanced to the quarterfinal round.

Heat 1

Heat 2

Heat 3

Heat 4

Heat 5

Heat 6

Quarterfinals

Three heats were held; the four fastest runners in each heat advanced to the semifinal round.

Quarterfinal 1

Quarterfinal 2

Quarterfinal 3

Semifinals

Two heats were held; the fastest three runners advanced to the final round.

Semifinal 1

Semifinal 2

Final

References

Athletics at the 1932 Summer Olympics
400 metres at the Olympics
Men's events at the 1932 Summer Olympics